Lonrai is a commune in the Orne department in north-western France.

World War II
After the liberation of the area by Allied Forces in August 1944, engineers of the Ninth Air Force IX Engineering Command began construction of a combat Advanced Landing Ground outside of the town.  Declared operational on 3 September, the airfield was designated as "A-45", it was used by several combat units until November when the units moved into Central France.  Afterward, the airfield was closed.

See also
Communes of the Orne department

References

Communes of Orne